Dreamland is a 2016 American musical comedy-drama film directed by Robert Schwartzman in directorial debut, from a screenplay by Benjamin Font and Schwartzman. It stars  Johnny Simmons, Amy Landecker, Jason Schwartzman, Noël Wells, Alan Ruck, Beverly D'Angelo, Talia Shire, Shay Mitchell, Frankie Shaw and Nick Thune.

The film had its world premiere at the Tribeca Film Festival on April 14, 2016. The film was released in a limited release and through video on demand by Orion Pictures and Gunpowder & Sky on November 11, 2016.

Premise
Monty Fagan (Johnny Simmons), a pianist, begins a relationship that upends his home life.

Cast

Production
In March 2015, it was revealed Robert Schwartzman would direct the film in his directorial debut from a screenplay by him and Benjamin Font, with Johnny Simmons, Amy Landecker, Frankie Shaw and Beverly D'Angelo would star in the film, while Schwartzman and Mel Eslyn producing.

Release
The film had its world premiere at the Tribeca Film Festival on April 14, 2016. Shortly thereafter, Orion Pictures and Gunpowder & Sky acquired US and Latin American rights to the film and set the release date for November 11, 2016.

Critical reception
Dreamland received mixed-to-positive reviews from film critics. Review aggregator Rotten Tomatoes gave the film a 67% approval rating, based on nine reviews, with an average rating of 5.92/10. On Metacritic, the film holds a rating of 55 out of 100, based on 4 critics, indicating "mixed or average reviews".

References

External links
 

2016 films
2016 comedy-drama films
2016 directorial debut films
2010s coming-of-age comedy-drama films
2010s musical comedy-drama films
American coming-of-age comedy-drama films
American independent films
American musical comedy-drama films
Films directed by Robert Schwartzman
Orion Pictures films
2010s English-language films
2010s American films